Naraku may refer to:

 Naraku, Iran, a village in Bushehr Province, Iran
 Naraka, one of the underworlds of Buddhism
 Naraku (奈落), a character in InuYasha
 Ninja Slayer's ninja spirit, from Ninja Slayer
Naraku from Senran Kagura video game franchise